North Somerset is a unitary district in Somerset, South West England. Whilst its area covers part of the ceremonial county of Somerset, it is administered independently of the non-metropolitan county. Its administrative headquarters is in the town hall in Weston-super-Mare.

North Somerset, which was renamed from the Woodspring district in 1996, borders the city and county of Bristol and the local government areas of Bath and North East Somerset, Mendip and Sedgemoor. The area comprises the parliamentary constituencies of Weston-super-Mare and North Somerset.

History
Between 1 April 1974 and 31 March 1996, this area was the Woodspring district of the county of Avon (named after Woodspring Priory, an isolated medieval church near the coast just north east of Weston-super-Mare). The district of Woodspring was formed from the municipal boroughs of Weston-super-Mare, Clevedon and Portishead urban districts, Long Ashton Rural District, and part of Axbridge Rural District.

Though the government proposed that the new unitary area be known as "North West Somerset" from 1 April 1996, the council voted instead to adopt the name "North Somerset" and so the name "North West Somerset" was never widely used. There remained some legal doubt as to whether the council had validly changed the name to "North Somerset", but in 2005 the council passed a resolution to put the matter beyond doubt.

Politics

North Somerset Council, a unitary authority, is elected every four years, with currently 61 councillors being elected at each election. Since the first election to the unitary authority in 1995, the council has either been under Conservative party control, or no party has held a majority. As of the 2019 election the council is composed of the following councillors:

Settlements

The principal towns in the district are the coastal towns of Weston-super-Mare, Portishead, Clevedon and Nailsea.

Abbots Leigh
Backwell, Banwell, Barrow Gurney, Blagdon, Bleadon, Bourton, Brockley, Burrington, Butcombe
 Cambridge Batch, Chelvey, Christon, Churchill, Clapton in Gordano, Claverham, Cleeve, Clevedon, Congresbury
Downside, Dundry
East End, East Hewish, East Rolstone, Easton in Gordano
Failand, Farleigh, Felton, Flax Bourton
Ham Green, Hutton
Icelton
Kenn, Kewstoke, Kingston Seymour
Leigh Woods, Locking, Lodway, Long Ashton, Lower Failand, Lower Langford, Loxton, Lulsgate Bottom
Maiden Head, Milton
Nailsea, North End, North Weston
Pill, Portbury, Portishead, Puxton
Redcliffe Bay, Redhill, Regil, Rickford
Sandford, Sheepway, Sidcot, St Georges, St Mary's Grove
Tickenham
Uphill, Upper Town
Walton in Gordano, West End, West Hewish, West Town, West Wick, Weston in Gordano, Weston-super-Mare, Wick St. Lawrence, Winford, Winscombe, Worle, Wraxall, Wrington
Yatton

Places of interest
North Somerset's natural environment and coastal towns attract visitors from nearby cities.  Notable geographical features include:
 Gordano Valley
 Mendip Hills – the ridgeway forms part of the district boundary
 Sand Bay and Sand Point
 Worlebury Hill
 Burrington Combe, Goblin Combe, Brockley Combe
 North Somerset Levels

Notable religious sites include Woodspring Priory.

Parishes

Economy
North Somerset's economy is traditionally based on agriculture, including sheep raised for wool on the Mendip Hills and dairy farming in the valleys. This is celebrated at the annual North Somerset Show. During the Georgian era tourism became a significant economic sector in the coastal towns, most notably Weston-super-Mare which grew from a small village to a large resort town.  Though tourism declined in the mid to late-20th century, in common with most British coastal resorts, this sector of the economy has stabilised.

In the 19th century the major port city of Bristol found that modern ships had outgrown the narrow river approach and the Port of Bristol company began seeking locations for new docks on the coast.  The first of these was Portishead Dock, which handled coal from South Wales, though this too has seen shipping outgrow its facilities.  The newer Royal Portbury Dock is noted for the large volume of car imports.

This is a chart of trend of regional gross value added of North and North East Somerset and South Gloucestershire at current basic prices (pp. 240–253) by Office for National Statistics with figures in millions of British Pounds Sterling.

 Components may not sum to totals due to rounding
 includes hunting and forestry
 includes energy and construction
 includes financial intermediation services indirectly measured

Demographics

The population of North Somerset has doubled since the 1950s and is predicted to rise by 6,184 or 3.0% to 2011 and by 17% to 2026. Whilst the proportion of people in North Somerset who are under 45 is lower than the national average, population growth is predicted to be strongest in the 2034 age group. Conversely North Somerset has a 4.2% higher percentage of older people (60+ female, 65+ male) than the rest of England and Wales. This disparity increases with age with the percentage of the population over 75 years almost 30% higher than the national average, resulting in a relatively aged population.

In 2001 there were 134,132 people of working age living in North Somerset and 91,767 were in employment; an economic activity rate of 68.4%. This is very close to the economic activity rate of the West of England sub-region which was 68.8% in the 2001 census.

The 2001 census stated that 1.38% of North Somerset residents identified themselves as belonging to a visible ethnic group and a further 1.27% identified themselves as 'white other'.

Education

The unitary authority of North Somerset, provides support for 78 schools, delivering education to approximately 28,000 pupils.

Weston College is the main provider of further education in the area. University Centre Weston offers higher education courses in conjunction with Bath Spa University and the University of the West of England.

See also

 Grade I listed buildings in North Somerset
 List of scheduled monuments in North Somerset

References

External links
North Somerset Council

 
Geography of Somerset
Avon (county)
Unitary authority districts of England
Local government in Somerset
Local government districts of South West England
1996 establishments in England